Gunntown Cemetery is an old cemetery in Naugatuck, Connecticut which was established in 1790. Many of Naugatuck's citizens who supported independence from British rule during the Revolutionary War are buried in the cemetery. The cemetery is also considered by many to be haunted.

The Gunns
The history of the Gunn family has been traced to before the colony of Connecticut. The first to arrive to Connecticut was Scottish-born Jasper Gunn (1606-1670). His first journey was from London to Boston on October 8, 1635. He and his wife then made their way to Roxbury, CT. Looking to start his own small colony, Jasper, with several other families from Roxbury and Dorchester, purchased even more land from the local Indians. Then on November 24, 1640, this area was named the town of Milford. Being considered one of the founders of Milford, Jasper Gunn was also considered to be Milford's first physician. After living in Milford for a while, he and his family moved around Connecticut a few times; in 1647 they moved to Harford. Along with being a doctor, Jasper Gunn did many other things. He was also a deacon at the church in Milford, a lawyer (for a few cases), and sealer of weights and measures. With all his life experience, he was made the main operator at Hartford’s Mill from 1649 to 1658. At his death in 1670, he and his wife Christian had seven children. His decedents have since spread throughout Connecticut, including Naugatuck.

The area that was once called Gunntown is an 800-acre area located just off of Naugatuck’s Rubber Ave Ext. The Gunn family was said to have lived and operated a sawmill in this area sometime around the 1740s. The Gunntown cemetery lies somewhat in the middle of area, with many people buried there bearing the same name.

Haunted reputation
Connecticut demonologists Ed and Lorraine Warren declared the cemetery to be "officially haunted". The most frequently reported phenomenon there is the sound of children's laughter and music that begins in the surrounding woods, then closes in on the listener until it seems to be inside the cemetery. Some people have also seen a solid black dog near the cemetery. Some feel that this is a foreboding sign of death. Sometimes a person clearly sees the black dog in the cemetery but his or her companions see nothing. There have also been reported cases of people hearing a large dog running towards them, but seeing nothing.

Many photographs that have been taken at the cemetery are purported to show spirit energy in the form of orbs, globules or ectoplasmic mist. On rare occasions, visitors have claimed to see colorful orbs flitting about the grounds with the naked eye.

Airing as a special for Halloween 2010, the paranormal investigation team CTPASTS (The Connecticut Paranormal And Supernatural Tracking Society) was featured in a segment regarding cemeteries on the television program Crossroads Magazine, with Gunntown paranormal activity being the focus. Team members William Jennings, and Jeffrey Gerry were interviewed regarding said activity.

References

External links
 Gunntown cemetery CT paranormal history and legends
 
 Gunntown Cemetery at Damned Connecticut Connecticut
 Gunntown Cemetery at Haunted Connecticut

Naugatuck, Connecticut
Reportedly haunted locations in Connecticut
Cemeteries in New Haven County, Connecticut
1790 establishments in Connecticut